Analía Verónica Núñez Sagripanti (born June 4, 1980, in David, Chiriquí), is a Panamanian model and beauty pageant contestant winner of the Señorita Panamá 1999. Also represented Panama in Miss Universe 2000, the 49th Miss Universe pageant was held at Eleftheria Stadium, Nicosia, Cyprus on May 12, 2000. She was 13th overall in preliminaries.

She represented Chiriquí state.

As model Analía taken part in calendars, commercial and as stewardess in different events also take part of Latin SuperModel Search in the 2000 and the Fashion Week of the Americas.

In 2016, she was one of the guest judge in the final of Miss Panamá 2016 in the Trump Ocean Club International Hotel and Tower, Ciudad de Panamá, Panama.

References

External links
Señorita Panamá official website
http://www.misspanama.net/

1980 births
Living people
Miss Universe 2000 contestants
Panamanian beauty pageant winners
Señorita Panamá